A railfan, rail buff or train buff (American English), railway enthusiast, railway buff or trainspotter (Australian/British English), or ferroequinologist is a person who is recreationally interested in trains and rail transport systems.

Railfans often combine their interest with other hobbies, especially photography and videography, radio scanning, railway modelling, studying railroad history and participating in railway station and rolling stock preservation efforts. There are many magazines and websites dedicated to railfanning and railway enthusiasts, including Trains, Railfan & Railroad, The Railway Magazine, Locomotive Magazine, and Railway Gazette International.

Other names
In the United Kingdom, rail enthusiasts are often called trainspotters or anoraks. The term gricer has been used in the UK since at least 1969 and is said to have been current in 1938 amongst members of the Manchester Locomotive Society, according to the Oxford English Dictionary. There has been speculation that the term derives from "grouser", one who collects dead grouse after a shoot, but other etymologies have also been suggested.

In Australia, they are sometimes referred to as "gunzels".

Numerous terms exist for rail enthusiasts in Japan, including Toritetsu for fans of photographing trains, Nori-tetsu (people who enjoy travelling by train) and Eki-tetsu (enthusiasts of train station architecture).

In the United States, they can be referred to pejoratively as "foamers". There is a dispute over the origin of this term. Some cite the extensive use of styrofoam to create scenery and landscaping in model railroad building, while others trace its origins to the related term "Foamite" (which stands for "Far Out and Mentally Incompetent Train Enthusiast") or claim it refers to "the notion of foaming-at-the-mouth craziness".

"Ferroequinologist" derives from the use of "Iron horse" as a nickname for early steam locomotives.

Activities

The hobby extends to all aspects of rail transport systems. Railfans may have one or more particular concentrations of interest, such as:

Railway locomotives and rolling stock
Still-used or disused railroad lines, bridges, tunnels, stations, signal boxes and other infrastructure
Subways and other local rail transit systems
Railway history
Railway photography
Railway books and magazines
Railtours
Railway signalling
Playing train simulators
Railway modelling, both physical and virtual model railroading, toy train collecting, live steam and outdoor miniature railways, and model engineering.
Collection of railway artifacts, in particular: tickets, timetables, railway paper, locomotive whistles, number plates, builders' plates, builder's photos, badges, uniforms, railway crockery and other railwayana. Many items, such as timetables and railway paper (i.e. internal railway documents), are collected for study and not just as collectibles.
Railway art or architecture
Railway operations, economics or commerce
Railway preservation/restoration
Level junction. This is where the railfan can also be interested in the railroad or "grade" crossing signals.
Monitoring railroad radio communications with a radio scanner.
The scope of the subject is so large that fans may additionally concentrate their interest on a particular country, town, railway company, field of operations or era in history – or a combination of any of the above.

Railway photography 

Train photography is a common activity of railfans. Most railfans do their photographing from public property, unless they have permission to use a specific private property owner's land. Occasionally, they run into problems with law enforcement, especially due to post 9/11 security concerns, because they are sometimes viewed as suspicious. In 2004, for example, the New York City Subway attempted to institute a photo ban, which was met with fierce opposition and ultimately scrapped. The Port Authority Trans–Hudson (PATH) successfully implemented a photo ban that is still in effect (although it predated the September 11 attacks and the 1993 World Trade Center bombing); it has led to confiscations and arrests on the PATH system.

 In the United Kingdom, photography is allowed at all stations on the National Rail network. Transport for London, however, does not allow photography without permission and a permit issued by the TfL Film Office. However, photography for personal use, without ancillary equipment is allowed without a permit. The Tyne and Wear Metro prohibits all photography without written permission from Nexus, the system's operators. As of 2015, it is the only system in the UK with such a policy.
 In Singapore, photography and filming is permitted in all MRT stations for non-commercial purposes during weekdays between 10am and 4pm.
 The Spanish RENFE railroad company used to ask for a permit, but since 2018 it is not needed.
 In Greece, railway photography is permitted on all networks
 In Russia, railway photography is permitted on all networks
 In Italy, the Royal Decree n°1161 enacted on July 11, 1941, concerning "military secrets", prohibited all and any photographs and video recordings in and around a number of civilian and military installations, including public railways. Railway photography was largely tolerated by tacit agreement, but could be prosecuted as a felony. The law was repealed by Legislative Decree n°66 enacted on March 15, 2010.
 In Germany, Deutsche Bahn allows non-commercial photography as long as no additional equipment such as tripods are used.
 In Indonesia, Kereta Api Indonesia allows photography on a train station and inside the train as long is for private use, on a public area and without additional equipment such as tripod and drones (unless they have a permit from the railway)

Trainspotting 

A trainspotter may use a data book listing the locomotives or equipment in question, in which locomotives seen are ticked off. An early trainspotter was 14-year-old Fanny Gordon, who in 1861 recorded the names of locomotives passing Westbourne Park station on the Great Western Railway. In Great Britain, this aspect of the hobby was given a major impetus by the publication from 1942 onward of the Ian Allan "ABC" series of booklets, whose publication began in response to public requests for information about the locomotives of the Southern Railway.

Railway trips

Bashing

The term "bashing" is used by railway enthusiasts to mean several things. Used alone, it is a general term for a railway enthusiast's trip, excursion or holiday involving train travel and observation. "Line bashing" is an attempt to cover as much of a railway network as possible. It may also be called "track bashing", especially if the person wishes to cover individual sections of track, such as crossovers and sidings, in addition to completing an "A to B" journey on each of the line's sections. In the UK (especially), Germany, and to a lesser extent other countries, railfans often use a special excursion train (usually known as a "railtour") to cover freight-only railway lines to complete their coverage of a country's rail network. "Shed bashing" describes going out to as many railway sheds or depots as possible. It was very popular in the 1950s and 1960s. As they required a permit that could be hard to obtain, some "shed bashers" were illegal.
Another development from trainspotting, almost unique to the UK, is the "haulage basher" or locomotive haulage enthusiast.

Fantrips

Many railway preservation groups run special trips for railfans using restored trains, often on "rare mileage" lines that do not see regular passenger service. These trips are both social events and opportunities for railfans to photograph unusual trains. Chasing a fantrip by road for the purposes of photography is often referred to as "motorcading" in Australia.

Other activities

Some enthusiasts combine their interest in trains with the hobby of monitoring radio communications, specializing in listening to radio communications of railroad operations using a scanner.

Origins of interest

The motivation for someone developing an interest in railways can come from many sources.

Nostalgia may also result from the long, lonesome wail of the train's horn, which mimics vocalizations that want for a more simple time reminiscent of home, as heard in country or folk music worldwide.

Safety
Railfans in the United States have been asked to keep railroad areas safer by reporting crimes and suspicious activity. In the United Kingdom the British Transport Police have asked trainspotters to report any unusual behaviour and activities at stations.

In the United States, concerns about terrorism have led to situations where railfans are followed or confronted by local law enforcement or transit police. This has also led to situations where certain transportation agencies have implemented photography bans systemwide.

A railfan was a factor in the 2008 Chatsworth train collision, as the driver responsible for the accident had been distracted by texting the railfan while in charge of his train, eventually causing it to pass a signal at danger and crash into an oncoming Union Pacific freight train, killing 25 and injuring 135 others.

The BNSF railway instituted the "Citizens for Rail Security" (CRS) program for the general public to report suspicious activities on their railways. Obtaining this card was common for railfans and is a derivative of the BNSF "On Guard" program for employees. However, this card does not recognize members as employees or contractors, asks them to keep off railway property, and is no longer obtainable. Amtrak offers a similar program, "Partners for Amtrak Safety and Security" (PASS).

In Japan, toritetsu have been frequently criticised for their behaviour when photographing trains, including incidents of vandalism and trespassing into restricted areas to set up cameras, destruction of lineside property and plants to clear a view of the track, stealing goods to sell on to fund expensive cameras, theft of railway equipment, being rude towards station staff and train drivers, physical assault, and attempting to intimidate passengers and road users for inadvertently interfering with their activities.

Network Rail, the British rail infrastructure owner and station operator, has produced guidelines for the behaviour and responsibilities of railway enthusiasts at its stations. In May 2010, the dangers of acting carelessly in the vicinity of an active railway were highlighted after an enthusiast, standing next to a double track line photographing the Oliver Cromwell, failed to notice a Turbostar express train approaching at ~70 mph (112 km/h) on the nearer track in the other direction, and came within inches of being struck by it.

See also

 Anorak (slang)

 List of railroad-related periodicals
 Rail terminology
 Railway enthusiasts societies in the United Kingdom
 Rail transport modelling
 RR (2008 railfan film by James Benning)
 Sensible Train Spotting, the world's first computer train spotting simulator
 Train whistle
 Tracks Ahead

Similar hobbies
 Aircraft spotting
 Bus spotting
 Gongoozlers, enthusiasts of canals in the United Kingdom
 Roadgeek
 Fire buffs, enthusiasts of firefighting and emergency services

Glossaries 

Glossary of North American railway terms
 Glossary of Australian railway terms
 Glossary of United Kingdom railway terms
 Glossary of New Zealand railway terms

References

Sources

Further reading

External links 

 

Fandom
Observation hobbies
Rail transport hobbies